Adrian Dominic Sinclair Johns (born 19 October 1965) is a British-born academic. He earned a doctorate from the University of Cambridge in 1992. He joined the University of Chicago faculty in 2001, and was appointed the Allan Grant Maclear Professor of History. He was awarded a Guggenheim fellowship in 2012.

Johns is best known for his works on the history of information, particularly The Nature of the Book: Print and Knowledge in the Making and Piracy: The Intellectual Property Wars from Gutenberg to Gates. 

Johns met Alison Winter at Cambridge in 1987, and the two married in 1992. She died in 2016.

Selected Bibliography

 Johns, Adrian. The Science of Reading: Information, Media, and Mind in Modern America. Chicago: University of Chicago Press, 2023. .
 Johns, Adrian. Death of a Pirate: British Radio and the Making of the Information Age. New York: W.W. Norton & Company, 2012. .
 Johns, Adrian. Piracy: The Intellectual Property Wars from Gutenberg to Gates. Chicago: University of Chicago Press, 2010. .
 Johns, Adrian. The Nature of the Book: Print and Knowledge in the Making. Chicago: University of Chicago Press, 1998. .

References

1965 births
Living people
British expatriate academics in the United States
Alumni of the University of Cambridge